Carolyn Chute (born Carolyn Penny, June 14, 1947) is an American writer and populist political activist who is strongly identified with the culture of poor, rural western Maine. Rod Dreher, writing in The American Conservative, has referred to Chute as "a Maine novelist and gun enthusiast who, along with her husband, lives an aggressively unorthodox life in the Yankee backwoods." She is a recipient of the PEN New England Award.

Life and work
Chute's first, and best known, novel, The Beans of Egypt, Maine, was published in 1985 and made into a 1994 film of the same name, which was directed by Jennifer Warren. Chute's next two books, Letourneau's Used Auto Parts (1988) and Merry Men (1994), are also set in the town of Egypt, Maine, as are the books in the Heart's Content series (The School on Heart's Content Road [2008], Treat Us Like Dogs and We Will Become Wolves [2014], and The Recipe for Revolution [2020]).

Her 1999 novel Snow Man deals with the underground militia movement, something that Chute has devoted more of her time to in recent years. She was the leader of a group that was known as the Second Maine Militia and is a fierce defender of the Second Amendment, keeping an AK-47 and a small cannon at her home in Maine. Chute also speaks out publicly about class issues in the US and publishes "The Fringe," a monthly collection of in-depth political journalism, short stories, and intellectual commentary on current events. She once ran a satiric campaign for governor of Maine.

In 2008, she published The School on Heart's Content Road, which deals with a polygamist compound in Maine under scrutiny after an article on them goes national. The project was originally a novel of more than 2,000 pages that was broken up into a projected five-part cycle. This was followed up by Treat Us Like Dogs and We Will Become Wolves (2014) and The Recipe for Revolution (2020).

Her jobs have included waitress, chicken factory worker, hospital floor scrubber, shoe factory worker, potato farm worker, tutor, canvasser, teacher, social worker, and school bus driver, 1970s-1980s; part-time suburban correspondent, Portland Evening Express, Portland, Maine, 1976–81; instructor in creative writing, University of Southern Maine, Portland, 1985.

Chute is closely associated with the New England Literature Program, an alternative education program run by the University of Michigan's English department during the university's spring term.  NELP students transcribed her 2008 novel The School on Heart's Content Road into an electronic format.

Chute was born in 1947 in Portland, Maine. She now lives in Parsonsfield, Maine, near the New Hampshire border, in a home with no telephone, no computer, and no fax machine, and an outhouse in lieu of a working bathroom. She is married to Michael Chute, a local handyman who never learned to read. She has a daughter from a previous marriage, Joannah; three grandchildren; and three dogs.

Use of politics in fiction
In Chute's 2019 The Recipe for Revolution, she portrays certain white American men who have taken up "heavy-duty" white identity, describing this political orientation as a form of extreme societal grief and associates it with being conspiracy-minded.

Bibliography
Novels
The Beans of Egypt, Maine, Ticknor & Fields, 1985, 
revised edition ; Grove Press, 2008, 
Letourneau's Used Auto Parts, Ticknor & Fields, 1988; Harcourt Brace & Co., 1995, 
Merry Men, Harcourt Brace, 1994, 

Treat Us Like Dogs and We Will Become Wolves, Grove Press, 2014, 

Nonfiction
Up River: The Story of a Maine Fishing Community, with Olive Pierce (University Press of New England, 1996)

Contributor
Inside Vacationland: New Fiction from the Real Maine, edited by Mark Melnicove (Dog Ear Press, 1985)
I Was Content and Not Content: The Story of Linda Lord and the Closing of Penobscot Poultry, by Cedric N. Chatterley and Alicia J. Rouverol (Southern Illinois University Press, 2000)
Late Harvest: Rural American Writing  (Reed Business Information, Inc., 1991)

Awards
First prize for fiction, Green Mountain Workshop, Johnson, Vermont, 1977.

She received a Guggenheim Fellowship and a Thornton Wilder Fellowship.

External links
 Interview with Carolyn Chute at newdemocracyworld.com
 Article in Salon.com
 Article in the New York Times, 3 November 2008
 http://archive.seacoastonline.com/news/kerr/10_19kerr.htm The Culling: By D. Allan Kerr, "For Some Artists, The Struggle Doesn't End"

References

1947 births
Living people
20th-century American novelists
People from Parsonsfield, Maine
Writers from Portland, Maine
Novelists from Maine
Place of birth missing (living people)
21st-century American novelists
American women novelists
20th-century American women writers
21st-century American women writers
University of Southern Maine faculty
Academics from Portland, Maine
American women academics